Kanshengel is a village in the Almaty Region of south-eastern Kazakhstan.

References

Populated places in Almaty Region